Lanes Mills is an unincorporated community in Jefferson County, in the U.S. state of Pennsylvania.

History
A post office was established at Lanes Mills in 1885, and remained in operation until 1942. Fred A. Lane was the second postmaster.

References

Unincorporated communities in Jefferson County, Pennsylvania
Unincorporated communities in Pennsylvania